Alexander Nikiforovich Popov ( 1840 – 18 August 1881) was a Russian organic chemist. He taught chemistry at the University of Kazan and at the University of Warsaw. He discovered what is now called Popov's Rule (or Popoff's Rule) which states that in the oxidation of a unsymmetrical ketone, the cleavage of the C−CO bond so that the smaller alkyl group is retained. 

Popov was born in Vitebsk where his father was a military officer. He studied at Kazan University and attended the chemistry lectures of A.M. Butlerov. Graduating in 1865 he worked as a chemical lab assistant and in 1868 received a master's degree and became a professor at the University of Warsaw. In 1871 he went to work in Bonn with August Kekulé and E.K. Theodor Zinkce. It was during this period that he established the so-called Popov's Rule on the oxidation of benzene homologues being directed to the carbon atom bonded directly to the ring. He received a doctorate in 1872 for work on ketone oxidation. He identified an ordering of stability of radicals based on his examination of oxidation of asymmetric ketones which has been called Popov's rule. He served in the Russo-Turkish War (1877-1878). He introduced the use of potassium dichromate (K2CrO7) and sulphuric acid as oxidation reagent in organic analysis.

References 

1840 births
1881 deaths
Russian chemists
Organic chemists
Kazan Federal University alumni